Pyaar Ke Side Effects is a 2006 Indian Hindi romantic comedy film. It was produced under the banner of Pritish Nandy communications and was written and directed by first time director Saket Chaudhary.  Mallika Sherawat and Rahul Bose played the lead cast. The film is a romantic comedy, and portrays the intricacies of a modern relationship. The film explores the theme of 'commitment phobia' in a captivating manner, an interesting, witty take on men-women relationships. After the success of this movie the lead pair were repeated in another film, Maan Gaye Mughal-e-Azam, however, that film could not match the success of this. A sequel, Shaadi Ke Side Effects, was released in 2014 with Vidya Balan and Farhan Akhtar in the lead roles.

Plot
Siddharth Bose aka Sid is a short, thirtyish DJ, who finds himself playing music at Trisha Mallik's marriage to Vivek Chaddha  in Delhi. However, he witnesses her fight her sense of responsibility and duty towards her parents and the groom, and runs away.

Six months later, he meets her again at a DJ competition in Mumbai, which he has just lost, yet again. Before you know it, they're in a relationship, and three years have passed. Trisha thinks she is ready for marriage, and gets down on her knee to propose to Sid. Sid suffering from the typical commitment phobia, is at a loss for a reasonable answer. In a bid to not lose her, Sid finds himself engaged.

But along with the engagement comes a new set of problems: shopping for furniture for their home, engagement rings, and more importantly, facing her father, Retired Major Veera Bhadra Mallik. Mallik has more than one problem with Sid, and thinks low of him, due to him earning a lot less than Trisha and not being responsible enough. Over an altercation Sid has with Mallik, the couple break up. Meanwhile, Vivek Chaddha is waiting in the wings, to help mend her broken heart. Sid on the other hand, finds himself being wooed by item girl, Tanya, the star of the 'Baby Girl Vol. 3' video.

After a few amusing run-ins, and an attempt to be just friends, Sid, finally realizes, thanks to his mother, that his commitment phobia is the result of a childhood scar. His father abandoned Sid and his mother, when Sid was very young. His mother reassures him, that he is nothing like his father, and would make a great husband. But it is too late, as Trisha has already agreed to marry Vivek. This leads him to Trisha's dear friend, Anjali, who reminds him of Dracula, because she always attacks him, for making Trisha unhappy. She helps him crash Trisha's wedding party. Trisha, after coming to know how much Sid has changed, happily breaks the wedding, and reunites with him.

Cast
 Mallika Sherawat as Trisha Mallik
 Rahul Bose as Siddharth "Sid" Bose
 Ranvir Shorey as Narayanan "Nanu" 
 Sophie Choudhary as Tanya (Baby Girl Vol.3)
 Suchitra Pillai-Malik as Anjali (Dracula)
 Sharat Saxena as Retd. Major Gen. Veera Bhadra Mallik
 Tarana Raja as Shalini
 Aamir Bashir as Kapil
 Jas Arora as Vivek Chaddha
 Sapna Bhavnani as Nina Manuel
  Shabnam Kapoor as Mrs. Mallik, Trisha's mother

Soundtrack

Pyaar Ke Side Effects, the album was released on 20 June 2006. It consisted of 6 Original songs and 3 Remixes composed by Pritam. It garnered generally Positive reviews from the critics. Narbir Gosal from Planet Bollywood rated the album 8/10 and wrote "Pritam has put together five good compositions on this album, but the pointless remixes and three versions of one song dilutes the impact. 'Pyar Karke', 'Jaane Kya' and 'Is This Love' stand head and shoulders above the rest, and on the whole this album is a definitely worth the buy."

Reception
Pyaar Ke Side Effects was a modest box office success, earning 74.7 million. The film garnered mixed reviews from critics. Several critics, such as Indiafm's Taran Adarsh felt that the second half of the film "drags".

Sequel
The Pyaar Ke Side Effects team announced a sequel Shaadi Ke Side Effects in June 2012 with Vidya Balan and Farhan Akhtar in the roles of Trisha and Sid. All the other technicians returned for the sequel along with the director and music director. The film was released on 28 February 2014.

References

External links
 

2006 films
2000s Hindi-language films
2006 romantic comedy films
Indian romantic comedy films
Films featuring songs by Pritam
Films set in Mumbai
Films about Indian weddings
2006 directorial debut films